Harry Bayly (27 July 1862 – 29 May 1935) was a New Zealand cricketer. He played two first-class matches for Taranaki in 1891/92.

His brothers included:
 Alfred Bayly (1866-1901), Taranaki cricket and rugby representative. New Zealand rugby representative and captain. 
 Frank Bayly (1860–1948), Taranaki cricket and rugby representative.
 George Bayly (1856-1938), Taranaki cricket and rugby representative. President of the Taranaki and New Zealand Rugby Union. 
 Walter Bayly (1869–1950), Taranaki and New Zealand rugby representative.

See also
 List of Taranaki representative cricketers

References

External links
 

1862 births
1935 deaths
New Zealand cricketers
Taranaki cricketers
Cricketers from New Plymouth